Colin Gordon Carruthers (17 September 1890 – 10 November 1957) was a British ice hockey player who competed in the 1924 Winter Olympics and in the 1928 Winter Olympics.

He was born in Ontario, Canada and died in Canada.

In 1924 he was a member of the British ice hockey team, which won the bronze medal.

Four years later he finished fourth with the British team in the 1928 Olympic tournament.

His younger brother Eric was also a team member in both competitions.

External links
Colin Carruthers' profile at databaseOlympics
Colin Carruthers' profile at Sports Reference.com

1890 births
1957 deaths
Canadian ice hockey players
Canadian people of British descent
Ice hockey people from Ontario
Ice hockey players at the 1924 Winter Olympics
Ice hockey players at the 1928 Winter Olympics
Olympic bronze medallists for Great Britain
Olympic ice hockey players of Great Britain
Olympic medalists in ice hockey
Medalists at the 1924 Winter Olympics